René Faure (14 January 1928 – 9 September 2005) was a French racing cyclist. He rode in the 1957 Tour de France.

References

1928 births
2005 deaths
French male cyclists
Place of birth missing